My Camp Rock is a singing competition based on the Disney Channel Original Movie Camp Rock and its sequel, Camp Rock 2: The Final Jam. Two series have been broadcast in the United Kingdom, and two editions in 2009 and 2010 in Sweden, Denmark, and Norway as My Camp Rock Scandinavia. 2010 saw the launching of the Benelux version of the show in Belgium, Netherlands, and Luxembourg.

British version

2009: My Camp Rock
My Camp Rock , the first season, was aired on Disney Channel UK from April 3, 2009, to April 25, 2009. The first promo aired to promote the show aired in March 2009. It was a singing competition that invited UK viewers to log online and make a video of themselves singing "This Is Me, and "We Rock" as a group, a duet or a solo, with entries posted from 19 December 2008, until the closing date, 11 February 2009. The competition was open to children aged 8 to 16. The best 8 entries were picked to participate in the TV show, and to attend a 4-day intensive Camp Rock-style singing and dancing workshop. The four judges whittled the 8 acts down to 4 to compete in the Final Jam, which was held at the Riverside Studios on April 24, 2009, where a viewer vote decided the winner. The winner was Holly Hull, 14 from Camberley, Surrey. The prize was for her to have a professional recording, release and music video of her version of  "This is Me", a song from the series.

The eight finalists had the opportunity to demonstrate their musical talent to the
panel of judges through a range of music based activities and also some physical activities. Guidance was provided to help the finalists prepare for the final audition. The finalists were filmed throughout the Boot Camp and the press were also at Boot Camp to interview the Boot Camp Finalists and publicise the
competition.

Finalists
Jessica Hammond - 15 from Belfast.
Holly Hull - 14 from Camberley, Surrey
DJ Ajayi - 14 from Solihull
Reece Cook - 11 from Lowestoft, Suffolk
Abby Timms and Lucy Jennings - 16/15 from Birmingham
Alex Doyle, Jasmin Huysmans and Briony Morgan - 13/14/15 from Dublin
Lillian Chan and Saachi Sen - Both 13 from Hampstead, London
Georgina Blyth - 12 from Lutterworth, Leicestershire

Episodes
Episode 1 - Friday 3 April 2009 at 5:35pm
Episode 2 - Friday 10 April 2009 at 5:35pm
Camp Jam - Friday 17 April 2009 at 5:35pm
Final Jam - Friday 24 April 2009 at 5:35pm
The Results Show - Saturday 25 April 2009 at 10:30am
The Winner's Music Video - Friday 1 May 2009 at 5:55pm

Episode 1
The show premiered on 3 April 2009 on Disney Channel UK  at 5:35pm and was hosted by JK and Joel. It started with the hosts, the Camp Rockers, vocal coach Zoe Tyler and choreographer Gary Lloyd introducing themselves. First the Camp Rockers each sang on their own in front of Zoe, Gary, JK and Joel .They then had a vocal and dance lesson. In the end the adults threw a welcome party for the Camp Rockers.

The songs Zoe Tyler chose for the contestants:
Jessica Hammond - "Here I Am"
Holly Hull - "Here I Am"
DJ Ajayi - "Who Will I Be"
Reece Cook - "Play My Music"
Abby Timms and Lucy Jennings - "2 Stars"
Alex Doyle, Jasmin Huysmans and Briony Morgan - "We Rock"
Lillian Chan and Saachi Sen - "This Is Me"
Georgina Blyth - "This Is Me"

Episode 2
A new episode was shown on 10 April 2009, again at 5:35 pm. It showed the contestants training for the Camp Jam, and some others being told what their song is, and it was announced that the Camp Jam would be on 17 April 2009, and that there would be four judges. The contestants' friends and family were there, and the best four contestants would go through to the Final Show, on April 25, 2009, where a viewer vote would decide the winner of My Camp Rock.

Camp Jam
The Camp Jam was on 17 April 2009, again at 5:35 pm. It started with the contestants practicing/preparing for the Camp Jam. First the contestants performed, and the judges decided which four finalists they should put through to the final. The four judges were: Zoe Tyler, Craig David, Martin Morales, and Gary Lloyd.

The 4 Final Acts were:
 Reece Cook
 Abby Timms and Lucy Jennings
 Holly Hull
 Jessica Hammond

Final Jam
The Final Jam was broadcast live on 24 April 2009, again at 5:35 pm, at the Riverside Studios in Hammersmith, London, where the four finalists battled it out to become the winner of My Camp Rock. There was a viewer vote from 6pm to 6:20pm, Disney Channel for viewers to log onto www.disneychannel.co.uk and vote for who they want to win the show.

The Results Show
The Results Show was on 25 April 2009 at 10:30 am. The Saturdays performed their song "Up" and Demi Lovato performed their single, "La La Land," and also presented the trophy to the winner. The winner was 14-year-old Holly Hull.

2010: My Camp Rock 2
My Camp Rock 2 premiered on Friday 13 August 2010 at 5.35pm. The series was presented by Sarah Jane Crawford and Nigel Clarke. The trainers, John Modi and Beth Honan set the finalists tasks to do each week, which were chosen to help the finalists develop their performance skills. The tasks are detailed in the episode summaries below. The final episode of the series aired on Friday 10 September 2010. In this episode the public voted for Shannon Saunders to win My Camp Rock 2 and have her version of a song from the series professionally recorded and released along with a music video.

Finalists
There were 4 finalists:
Leanne Fotheringham
Parisa Tarjomani 
Shannon Saunders
Ryan Hulme

Episodes
Episode 1
In this episode, the 4 finalists were introduced and set a task by John Modie to go busking in Covent Garden. Beth Honan surprised the finalists during dance training when she arranged for dance group Flawless to come to the studio and help the finalists learn the dance routine to the Camp Rock 2 song "Fire".

Episode 2
In this episode, the finalists were given their songs that they would have to perform in the final, which John Modi picked to suit their individual styles. Leanne was given 'Can't Back Down,' Parisa was given 'It's Not Too Late,' Shannon Saunders was given 'Introducing Me,' and Ryan was given 'Heart and Soul.' They were also given parts of the Camp Rock 2 song "It's On" to perform as a group. Beth Honan helped the finalists to develop their dance skills by getting them to perform their parts of "It's On" with each other. John Modi also gave the finalists a task of performing their songs at the International Youth Arts Festival in Kingston. The finalists were given individual coaching beforehand by pop star Simon Webbe, who went to the Youth Arts Festival with the finalists to give them support.

Episode 3
In this episode, Beth Honan gave the finalists individual tuition to give them more confidence to be able to perform their individual songs in front of the cameras. John Modi set the finalists their first individual tasks, Leanne was set the task of climbing a climbing wall to help her to overcome a fear of heights and give her more confidence, Shannon was set the task of working on a fruit and vegetables stall in a market to giver her confidence of performing in front of a crowd and stop her being shy. Parisa was set the task of trying to sell perfume and aftershave to the public in a city centre street to help to build her confidence and be able to connect with the audience better and Ryan was sent to visit a martial arts sensei to help him to build his confidence. The finalists were also shown being told about their next task, which was to perform individual "gigs" in their home town in front of their friends and families.

Episode 4
In this episode, the finalists performed individual gigs in their home towns in front of their friends and families. The finalists were also shown arriving at the venue for the My Camp Rock 2 final, Koko.

Episode 5
This double length episode, which aired on Friday 10 September 2010, was the final episode of My Camp Rock 2 where the finalists performed their final  songs of the competition. The public voted the winner of the competition to be 16 year old Shannon Saunders who performed the song 'Introducing Me'. The singer from Wiltshire, England is a self-taught guitarist and pianist. Her prize was to have her version of a song from the series professionally recorded and released together with a music video. This was followed by recording the song "I See the Light" for the British version of the Disney film Tangled.

My Camp Rock 2 Extra Jam
'This was a series of 5-minute shorts featuring the finalists of My Camp Rock 2 with extras such as "sneak peeks" of performances, interviews, training and tasks the finalists were set.

Scandinavian version

2009: My Camp Rock Scandinavia
A joint Scandinavian series of the format was broadcast in Sweden, Denmark and Norway via the Disney Channel Scandinavia in 2009 and presented by Lebanese-Swedish singer and presenter Eric Saade. The series was won by Swedish Shenie Fogo who performed the song "Here I Am".

2010: My Camp Rock 2 Scandinavia
A follow-up series was broadcast in 2010. The winner in the second and final season was the 13-year-old Swedish candidate Vendela Hollström singing "Its Not Too Late". Another song "Fire" by Swedish Ola Svensson, Danish Mohamed Ali and Norwegian Endre Nordvik became well known after it was adopted as the theme song for My Camp Rock 2.

Benelux version

2010: My Rock Camp Benelux
My Rock Camp was also broadcast jointly for Benelux countries Belgium, the Netherlands and Luxembourg in 2010. The winners were Cheyenne & Mayleen.

Spanish version

2009: My Camp Rock Spain
Winner: Lucía Gil (10, Madrid)

2010: My Camp Rock 2 Spain
Winner: Ana Mena (14, Málaga)

French version

2009: My Camp Rock France
Winners: Cynthia (15, Arles) & Félix (16, Meaux)
They sang the French version of "We Rock".

2010: My Camp Rock 2 France
Winners: Nicolas (15, Pau) & Noémie (16, Paris)
They sang the French version of "It's On"

References

External links

Singing competitions
Camp Rock
Disney Channel (British and Irish TV channel) original programming